Ninja Kiwi, previously known as Kaiparasoft Ltd, is a mobile and online video game developer founded in Auckland, New Zealand, in 2006  by brothers Chris and Stephen Harris. Ninja Kiwi's first game was a browser based game called Cash Sprint, developed on the Adobe Flash Platform. Since then, they have produced more than 60 games across platforms including Adobe Flash, Android, iOS, PlayStation Portable, Nintendo DS, and more recently, Steam. Their most well-known titles are the Bloons and Bloons Tower Defense games. In 2012, Ninja Kiwi purchased Digital Goldfish, a Dundee, Scotland-based developer, for an undisclosed sum.

Ninja Kiwi has a virtual currency known as NK Coins; purchases of games and in-game purchases can be transacted using NK Coins. About eighteen months before its dissolution by its parent company, Mochi Media (another major gaming website) discontinued its virtual currency (Mochi Coins) and replaced it with Ninja Kiwi's virtual currency.

Ninja Kiwi was acquired by Modern Times Group on 24 March 2021.

History
Ninja Kiwi Games was founded by Chris and Stephen Harris in 2006. The decision to develop games was brought about by Stephen upon completion of a game design course at the Auckland Media Design School. He had previously graduated at the University of Auckland with a degree in geophysics. The first game that the brothers created was the now-defunct Cash Sprint, a browser-based game where players raced a ghost car and the player with the fastest time each week was rewarded a cash prize. However, they were unable to draw in advertisers to finance the project and were forced to scrap it after 14 weeks of operation. Next, they launched their own web portal that pooled to get
developer, Digital Goldfish, who wanted to team up to release Bloons as an iPhone application, where it reached the number two position in the US app store. The relationship between Ninja Kiwi and Digital Goldfish continued long after this, with several members of the Digital Goldfish staff being completely devoted to the mobile development of Ninja Kiwi games. 

In 2012, Ninja Kiwi purchased Digital Goldfish. The previous titles that the two companies created together had racked up millions of downloads. Due to the already close relationship between the two companies, the merger was described by Digital Goldfish co-founder, Barry Petrie, as a "natural progressive step in the relationship between the two companies". Digital Goldfish was renamed Ninja Kiwi Europe. The merger increased the total number of Ninja Kiwi employees to 35. By 2021, the total number of employees had increased to 70.

On March 24, 2021, Ninja Kiwi was acquired by Modern Times Group for around 1.6 billion Swedish crowns ($186 million USD), to "broaden its gaming portfolio", with expressed intent to expand into the tower defense genre whilst still maintaining the high quality standards that it strives for. The negotiations with MTG began on January 14, 2021, starting with an initial sum of between $130 to $150 million USD. Maria Redlin, MTG's group president and CEO, expressed her interest for acquiring Ninja Kiwi because of how they have created a "successful combination of paid and in-app purchase models in its pricing structure", which she argues is a major factor in Ninja Kiwi's success at creating quality games. The founders of Ninja Kiwi have responded that they are "genuinely excited to join MTG", with intent to join them on creating future business opportunities together. Ninja Kiwi had also announced their plans with MTG over the next year, including releasing Bloons TD Battles 2, the sequel to the multiplayer tower defense game Bloons TD Battles.

Subsidiaries
 Ninja Kiwi Europe (formerly Digital Goldfish) in Dundee, Scotland, was acquired in 2012.

Games

Bloons Games

Bloons was a major breakthrough for Ninja Kiwi. The idea came from developer Stephen Harris' wife, who suggested they make a game similar to the carnival game where people throw darts at balloons. The original Bloons was released in April 2007 under the Kaiparasoft Ltd. label and has spawned many sequels and spinoffs, including the also-successful Bloons TD, Bloons Monkey City and sub-series such as Bloons Super Monkey.

Bloons Pop! is a spin-off mobile game of the main Bloons series that incorporates elements of the Bloons TD series with puzzle gameplay.

Bloons TD Games

Following the release of Bloons in 2007, the Bloons Tower Defense series also saw its first release in the same year with the game of the same name. Unlike the "aim and shoot" gameplay of Bloons, the Tower Defense games focused on building towers to stop balloons from reaching the exit of the track, with different towers offering different styles of attack. This game was followed by several sequels.

Bloons TD Battles is a multiplayer-oriented version of Bloons TD 5 where the aim of the game is to make the player lose all their lives by sending bloons while defending against the opponent's bloons at the same time. The first person to make the opponent have 0 lives wins and gets a battle score/medallions for winning. 

Bloons TD 6 is the currently newest installment of the Bloons TD series, and the aim of the game remains mostly similar to other games of the Bloons TD series, but with additional features that earlier games of the series lack.

Bloons TD Battles 2 is a multiplayer-oriented version of Bloons TD 6, as well as a sequel to Bloons TD Battles. It hosts all the new towers from the latest installment of the Bloons TD series, remaining with the same objective as its predecessor in the Battles series.

Bloons Super Monkey 
Bloons Super Monkey is the first game in the Bloons Super Monkey series and centers around arcade gameplay. Also having a mobile port with the only difference being the ability to load and create saves.

Gameplay 
In the game you must move around the player character which is a monkey in superhero clothing (hence, Super Monkey) around with your mouse. And you must pop Bloons to earn a currency named Power Blops to acquire upgrades to make your Super Monkey stronger and pop more Bloons, and therefore get more Power Blops. The Super Monkey throws darts automatically, and can upgraded to throw other projectiles. 

After every round, you are graded on how many Bloons you popped and then are brought to the shop where you can spend your Power Blops. The grading system has 3 tiers:

 Bronze
 Silver
 Gold

To be able to succeed and go onto the next round, you must pop enough Bloons to get at minimum Bronze or else you shall get a game over screen.

The game over screen showcases a torn cape hanging off a tree, while a purple Bloon rests nearby and sheep are in the background. But if you can pop enough Bloons to get past the last round you shall get a victory screen showcasing the Super Monkey flying up in the sky with fanfare and fireworks in the background, and the text "You Win!"

Ninja Kiwi Archive 
The Ninja Kiwi Archive was released July 8th, 2020 as a way for NinjaKiwi to preserve their original Flash games after its end-of-life announcement by Adobe as a free Steam app. This allows 67 of their flash games, with the exception of Who Wants To Be A Bloonionaire? and Bloons TD 5 Deluxe to be played after Flash's end-of-life, however it still requires an internet connection for the games to be played. 12th January 2021, NinjaKiwi officially removed its flash games from the playable section of the website, and simultaneously announced that because of the end-of-life deadline, the archive will remain indefinitely unplayable. However, the app was fixed again in February 2021 and in March of the same year was released as an independent launcher that does not require Steam.

SAS Zombie Assault 3

SAS Zombie Assault was another Ninja Kiwi game released on March 24th, 2011 for the closed beta and fully released on June 6th, 2011 for the open beta. The iOS version was released on December 20th, 2011.

The game begins with members of the elite Special Air Service (SAS) being sent into a rural area after reports of zombie attacks. The mission is to investigate these incidents as well as get rid of any evidence, but while staging an operation in a farmhouse, the SAS become under attack by a horde. After shooting down the zombies and surviving the attack, the members of the SAS investigate and eliminate the source of the new strain of zombies.

SAS Zombie Assault 4

SAS Zombie Assault 4 was released back in May 11, 2014 (open beta) which was a top-down shooter game with game modes such as Single-player and Multi-player.

Awesome Points 
Awesome Points are used to keep track of a player's achievements and medals they earn within Ninja Kiwi games. Depending on how much Awesome Points a player has, they may level up.

Leveling up entails a newly earned title with the highest being rewarded at Level 59 being called "Sky Spirit", and a spin of the wheel of fate, and a new avatar as a reward. Awesome Points can also go to a Clan's total awesome, pushing their clan up the rankings.  Another reward that comes with levelling up is either differently colored profile stars to the value of one's votes on the forum being multiplied.

References

External links
Ninja Kiwi Website

2006 establishments in New Zealand
 Video game companies established in 2006
 Video game companies of New Zealand
 Browser-based game websites
2021 mergers and acquisitions